Daniel Smith was a football goalkeeper who played one game for Port Vale in March 1923.

Career
Smith joined Port Vale in August 1922. His only appearance came in a 3–1 defeat to Southampton at The Dell on 5 March 1923. He was released at the end of the 1922–23 season after failing to dislodge Teddy Peers.

Career statistics
Source:

References

Year of birth missing
Year of death missing
English footballers
Association football goalkeepers
Port Vale F.C. players
English Football League players